Shayan Roy (born 10 September 1991) is an Indian footballer who played as a goalkeeper for TRAU in the I-League.

Career

Pailan Arrows
During the summer of 2011 Roy signed for I-League developmental side Pailan Arrows for the 2011-12 season. On 12 February 2012 Roy made his debut for Pailan Arrows in the I-League against Dempo S.C. after number 1 keeper Naveen Kumar was sent off with a red card in the 34th minute. Pailan lost the match 0–2 with both goals occurring after Roy came in.

Career statistics

Club
Statistics accurate as of 11 May 2013

Apps = Appearances || C S = Clean Sheets

References

Indian footballers
1991 births
Living people
I-League players
Indian Arrows players
Association football goalkeepers
Footballers from Kolkata